Grass Curtain was a quarterly journal of Southern Sudanese politics and current events published by the Southern Sudan Association in London between 1970 and 1972. Enoch Mading de Garang was the journal's co-founder and editor-in-chief.  The Grass Curtain was closely linked to the Southern Sudan Liberation Movement (SSLM), the political arm of Anya-Nya, a collection of Southern Sudanese separatist movements formed during the First Sudanese Civil War.  The journal was published in large part to generate wider support for the South Sudanese cause.

Name

The journal's name, Grass Curtain, evoked the Iron Curtain, referring to the boundaries of disinterest and political oppression that obscured the conflict in Southern Sudan from wider attention.

See also
Iron Curtain
Anya-Nya
National Archives of South Sudan
Southern Sudan Association

Notes

References

External links
Communist Party of Sudan

Communist magazines
Defunct political magazines published in the United Kingdom
Magazines established in 1970
Quarterly magazines published in the United Kingdom
Magazines disestablished in 1972
Magazines published in London